English drum and bass band Rudimental has released four studio albums, one extended play and seventeen singles.

Their debut studio album, Home, was released in April 2013. The album reached number one on the UK Albums Chart. On 14 May 2012, they released "Feel the Love", featuring vocals from John Newman, as the album's lead single. The song entered the UK Singles Chart at number one, making it their first number one single in the UK. The song also was a top 5 hit in Australia, Belgium, the Netherlands, and New Zealand, also charting in Austria, Denmark, Germany, and Ireland. On 18 November 2012, they released the album's second single "Not Giving In", featuring vocals from Newman and Alex Clare. It debuted and peaked at number 14 on the UK Singles Chart. "Waiting All Night", featuring Ella Eyre, was released as the third single from the album in 2013, reaching number one in the UK Singles Chart on 21 April 2013. The next single released was "Powerless", featuring Becky Hill.

Their second studio album, We the Generation, was released on 2 October 2015. Rudimental were given a writing credit on "Bloodstream" by Ed Sheeran, taken from his second studio album, x. On 28 April 2015, the band unveiled a new song called "Never Let You Go", which was the lead single from the album.

Rudimental released their third album, Toast to Our Differences on 25 January 2019. It is preceded by the singles "Sun Comes Up", "These Days" (which became their third number one) and "Let Me Live".

Albums

Extended plays

Singles

As lead artist

As featured artist

Promotional singles

Remixes

References

Notes

Sources

Discographies of British artists